The Grafton Ghosts are an Australian rugby league football team based in Grafton, New South Wales. The club was founded in 1963 as a joint venture of the Grafton All Blacks and Grafton United teams.

Notable players
Danny Wicks (2006-16 St George Illawarra Dragons, Newcastle Knights & Parramatta Eels)
Anthony Don (2013-21 Gold Coast Titans)
Daine Laurie (2020- Penrith Panthers, Wests Tigers)

Life Members
1970 Boyd Nattrass  
1976 Peter Nay    
1976 John Stokes    
1978 Joe Kinnane 
1986 Barry Woolfe  
1990 Grahame Brotherson    
2004 Michael Rogan   
2007 Tony Duroux    
1978 Harry Blair   
1986 John Morgan    
1996 Stephen Haines    
1998 Greg Vidler    
2000 Gary Smith    
2000 Kerry Godwin    
2003 Vic McInnes   
2011 Fred Johnson

Clayton Cup
The Clayton Cup has been awarded to the best team each year in the Country Rugby League which has been happening since 1937. The Grafton Ghosts have won the prestigious award on three occasions, in 2010, 2011 and 2017.

Playing Record 
Playing record compiled from scores published in the Rugby League Week.

See also

References

External links and Sources
 
 Rugby League Week at State Library of NSW Research and Collections

Rugby league teams in New South Wales
Grafton, New South Wales
Rugby clubs established in 1963
1963 establishments in Australia